Demeter Bitenc (21 July 1922 – 22 April 2018) was a Slovenian film actor. He appeared in more than 150 films and television shows from 1953 to 2018. He was born in Ljubljana, Slovenia.

Selected filmography

 Sinji galeb (1953)
 Pulverschnee nach Übersee (1956) - John Meredith (uncredited)
 Dobri stari pianino (1959) - Nemski oficir
 Akcija (1960) - Gestapovec
 Flitterwochen in der Hölle (1960) - José Antonio García
 Island of the Amazons (1960) - Leblanc
 Das Mädchen mit den schmalen Hüften (1961) - Stefan
 Dancing in the Rain (1961) - Profesor
 The Festival Girls (1961) - Member of Jury
 Treibjagd auf ein Leben (1961) - Coco
 Fire Monsters Against the Son of Hercules (1962) - Dorok - Father of Aydar
 Minuta za umor (1962)
 The Triumph of Robin Hood (1962) - Sigmund (uncredited)
 Il bandito della luce rossa (1962)
 Colossus and the Headhunters (1963) - Ariel
 The Saracens (1963) - Rabaneck
 Das Rätsel der roten Quaste (1963) - Mantel
 Apache Gold (1963) - Dick Stone
 Shadow of Treason (1963)
 Ring of Spies (1964) - (uncredited)
 Holiday in St. Tropez (1964) - Fred
 Das Haus auf dem Hügel (1964)
 Heiss weht der Wind (1964)
 The Crooked Road (1965)
 Fire Over Rome (1965) - Menecrate
 The Bandits of the Rio Grande (1965) - Elgaut
 Maciste, the Avenger of the Mayans (1965) - Gruno
 Duel at Sundown (1965) - Mack
 Amandus (1966) - Second ostler
 The Seventh Continent (1966) - Otec bílého chlapce
 Missione apocalisse (1966) - Croupier (uncredited)
 Star Black (1966) - Burt
 Target for Killing (1966) - Cloy - ein Killer
 Ballad of a Gunman (1967) - Bradley (uncredited)
 Grajski biki (1967)
 Come rubare un quintale di diamanti in Russia (1967) - Stark (uncredited)
 Fast ein Held (1967) - Monsieur Le Baron
 Nevidni bataljon (1967) - Lieutenant
 Dobar vetar 'Plava ptico''' (1967)
 Soncni krik (1968) - Detektiv
 Peta zaseda (1968) - major Viktor
 Operation Cross Eagles (1968) - Bell
 La porta del cannone (1969)
 The Bridge (1969) - Nimayer
 Battle of Neretva (1969) - Schröder
 The Ravine (1969) - Lietenant Eisgruber
 Poppea's Hot Nights (1969) - Tigellinus
 The Fifth Day of Peace (1970) - Maggiore Brandt
 Riuscirà il nostro eroe a ritrovare il più grande diamante del mondo? (1971) - Kruger (uncredited)
 Devetnaest djevojaka i jedan mornar (1971) - Njemacki kapetan
 Walter Defends Sarajevo (1972) - Pukovnik Wansdorf
 Begunec (1973) - Agent 
 England Made Me (1973) - Reichsminister
 Battle of Sutjeska (1973) - Clan engleske vojne misije
 Mirko i Slavko (1973) - Nemacki komandant
 Pastirci (1973) - Sharpener
 Pomladni veter (1974)
 141 perc a befejezetlen mondatból (1975)
 Crvena zemlja (1975) - Obersturmführer
 Med strahom in dolznostjo (1975)
 Private Vices, Public Pleasures (1976)
  (1976) - Miro (uncredited)
 Cross of Iron (1977) - Capt. Pucher (uncredited)
 Real Pests (1977) - Brinovec
 Dark Echoes (1977) - Woodcutter
 Mannen i skuggan (1978) - Berg
 Draga moja Iza (1979) - Josip Heisinger
 Partizanska eskadrila (1979) - German Colonel
 Iskanja (1979) - Hotelir
 Lyubov i yarost (1979)
 Prestop (1980) - Sekretar
 The Secret of Nikola Tesla (1980)
 See You in the Next War (1980) - Partizanski oficir
 High Voltage (1981) - Prodavac skica za generator
 Pustota (1982)
 The Smell of Quinces (1982) - Adjutant
 Eva (1983) - Projektant
 Dih (1983) - Berglez
 Od petka do petka (1985)
 Ada (1985) - Stipanic
 Nas clovek (1985)
 Doktor (1985)
 The War Boy (1985) - Arrow Cross officer
 Tempi di guerra (1987)
 Zivela svoboda! (1987) - Zupan
 Destroying Angel (1987) - Taxi driver
 War and Remembrance (1988, TV Mini Series)
 Kavarna Astoria (1989) - Medenik
 Donator (1989) - Pukovnik Leibnitz
 Decembrski dez (1990)
 Captain America (1990) - Industrialist #1
 The Pope Must Die (1991) - Raggio
 Outsider (1997) - Headmaster
 Irrlichter (1997) - Dr. Herzog
 Stereotip (1997) - Smiljan Lehpamer
 Oda Presernu (2001) - Profesor
 Pozabljeni zaklad (2002) - Zupnik
 Deseta zapoved (2003) - Frenk
 Dergi in Roza v kraljestvu svizca (2004)
 Delo osvobaja (2004) - The Neighbour
 Long Dark Night (2005, TV Series)
 Dobro ustimani mrtvaci (2005) - Uros
 Gravehopping (2005) - Starec
 Ljubljana je ljubljena (2005) - Sef Vic
 Vztrajanje (2017) - Husband
 Milice 2'' (2017) - German guest (final film role)

References

External links

1922 births
2018 deaths
Actors from Ljubljana
Slovenian male film actors
20th-century Slovenian male actors
21st-century Slovenian male actors